High Dive is the fourth album by American singer-songwriter Maria McKee, released in 2003.

Track listing
All songs by Maria McKee, except where noted.

"To the Open Spaces" (Jim Akin, McKee) – 3:13
"Life Is Sweet" – 3:49
"After Life" (Bruce Brody, McKee) – 1:33
"Be My Joy" – 4:14
"High Dive" – 4:02
"My Friend Foe" – 3:40
"In Your Constellation" – 4:19
"Love Doesn't Love" (Jim Akin, McKee) – 4:15
"We Pair Off" – 4:39
"No Gala" – 1:56
"Non Religious Building" (Jim Akin, McKee) – 5:09
"Something Similar" – 5:40
"From Our T.V. Teens to the Tomb" – 4:29
"Worry Birds" – 3:56

Personnel
 Maria McKee – vocals, guitar, keyboards, arranger, producer
 Jim Akin – vocals, lap steel guitar, bass guitar, keyboards, arranger, producer, engineer
 Chris Bleth – saxophone
 Richard Dodd – cello
 Tom Dunne – drums, percussion
 Dennis Farias – trumpet
 Terry Glenny – violin
 Eric Gorfain – violin, conductor, arranger
 Nick Lane – trombone
 Stephanie Mijanovich – French horn

Production
Producers: Jim Akin, Maria McKee
Mixing: Jim Akin
Mastering: Jim Akin
Arrangers: Jim Akin, Maria McKee
Horn arrangements: Jim Akin, Maria McKee
String arrangements: Jim Akin, Eric Gorfain, Maria McKee
Art direction: Jim Akin, Maria McKee
Paintings: Maria McKee
Artwork: Kevin Robinson
Photography: Jim Akin

Charts

References

Maria McKee albums
2003 albums